In differential geometry, an isoparametric function is a function on a Riemannian manifold whose level surfaces are parallel and of constant mean curvatures.

See also

Isoparametric manifold

References

Riemannian geometry